The list of ambassadors from Japan to Algeria started when the first diplomat presented his credentials to the Algerian government in 1964.

Diplomatic relations were established in 1962.  The embassy in Algiers opened in 1964.

List

 Tsukasa Kawada

References

Algeria
Japan
Ambassadors